(? – October 25, 686) lived during the Asuka Period. She was a daughter of Emperor Tenji. Her mother was Lady Hitachi, whose father was Soga no Akae.

She married Prince Ōtsu, and they had one son, Prince Awazuou. When Prince Ōtsu was executed in 686, she ran out of her house in bare feet with hair disheveled, and killed herself. It is said that people watching her death sobbed with sorrow.

References 

Japanese princesses
686 deaths
Year of birth unknown
7th-century Japanese people
7th-century Japanese women
Daughters of emperors